The San Jose City Council, officially San José City Council, is the legislature of the government of the City of San Jose, California.

As the Mayor of San Jose, Matt Mahan casts the 11th vote on matters before the council and acts as chair of the council during most meetings. Rosemary Kamei serving her first two-year term as Vice Mayor, conducts Council meetings in the absence of the Mayor.

Current councilmembers

Elections
All elections are officially non-partisan and candidates' political parties are not shown on ballots.

2022

2020

References

External links
San Jose City Council

Government of San Jose, California
California city councils